Richard Henry Bayard (September 26, 1796 – March 4, 1868) was an American lawyer and politician from Wilmington, Delaware. He was a member of the Whig Party, who served as the first Mayor of Wilmington, Chief Justice of the Delaware Superior Court, and as U.S. Senator from Delaware.

Early life and family

Bayard was born in Wilmington, Delaware, son of James A. Bayard, Sr., and Nancy Bassett Bayard. His father was a member of the Federalist Party, who served as U.S. Representative from Delaware and U.S. Senator from Delaware. His mother was the daughter of another U.S. Senator from Delaware, Richard Bassett. His younger brother, James A. Bayard Jr., was also a U.S. Senator from Delaware.

Professional and political career
Bayard graduated from Princeton College in 1814, studied law, and was admitted to the bar in 1818. His practice was in Wilmington, where he became the first mayor of the newly incorporated city in 1832.

In 1836, Bayard was elected as an Anti-Jacksonian to the United States Senate, to fill the vacancy caused by the resignation of U.S. Senator Arnold Naudain. He served from June 17, 1836 to September 19, 1839, when he resigned to become Chief Justice of the Delaware Supreme Court. He served in that capacity for two years, from 1839 to 1841, when he resigned, being once again elected to the United States Senate, this time as a Whig.  The position had been vacant since his own resignation in 1839. This time, he served from January 12, 1841 until March 3, 1845. While in the United States Senate, he was chairman of the Committee on Private Land Claims in the 27th Congress, a member of the Committee on District of Columbia in the 27th Congress, and a member of the Committee on Naval Affairs in the 27th Congress and 28th Congress.  He did not seek reelection in 1844, but later served as chargé d'affaires to Belgium from 1850 to 1853.

Death and legacy
Bayard died at Philadelphia and is buried in the Wilmington and Brandywine Cemetery at Wilmington. He was the second of five Bayards to serve in the United States Senate.

Almanac
The General Assembly chose the U.S. Senators, who took office March 4 for a six-year term. In this case, he was initially completing the existing term, the vacancy caused by the resignation of Arnold Naudain. However, he resigned the position before the term ended only to accept appointment over a year later in a new term which he completed. Between his resignation and appointment, the position was vacant.

Notes

References

Images
Biographical Directory of the United States Congress; portrait courtesy of the Delaware State Archives.

External links
Biographical Directory of the United States Congress
Delaware’s Members of Congress
Find a Grave
The Political Graveyard

Places with more information
Delaware Historical Society; website ; 505 North Market Street, Wilmington, Delaware 19801; (302) 655-7161
University of Delaware; Library website; 181 South College Avenue, Newark, Delaware 19717; (302) 831–2965

1796 births
1868 deaths
People from Wilmington, Delaware
Richard H.
National Republican Party United States senators from Delaware
Whig Party United States senators from Delaware
Chief Justices of Delaware
Mayors of Wilmington, Delaware
Ambassadors of the United States to Belgium
Delaware lawyers
19th-century American judges
19th-century American lawyers
Princeton University alumni
Burials at Wilmington and Brandywine Cemetery